Mahenes is a genus of beetles in the family Cerambycidae, containing the following species:

 Mahenes demelti Breuning, 1980
 Mahenes semifasciatus Aurivillius, 1922

References

Acanthocinini